Shizhong District is one of 10 urban districts of the prefecture-level city of Jinan, the capital of Shandong Province, East China, forming part of the city's urban core. It is located to the southwest of the historical city center. It borders the districts of Tianqiao to the north, Lixia to the northeast, Licheng to the east and southeast, Changqing to the southwest, and Huaiyin to the northwest.

Administrative divisions

References

External links 
Official home page

Shizhong District
Jinan